William Notman (1826–1891) was a Scottish-Canadian photographer and businessman.

William Notman may also refer to:

 William Notman (politician) (1805–1865), Canadian politician
 William Notman (architect) (1809–1893), Scottish architect